Jorge Jonathan Espericueta Escamilla (born 9 August 1994) is a Mexican professional footballer who plays as a midfielder.

Jonathan Espericueta was part of the Mexican U17 team who won the 2011 FIFA U-17 World Cup hosted in Mexico. Espericueta was a vital part of the team, playing all 7 matches and scoring 2 goals in the tournament, One of the goals being a memorable olympic goal against Germany in the semifinal to equalize the score.

Club career

Tigres UANL
Espericueta made his debut for Tigres UANL on 18 September 2012 against Real Estelí in the 2012–13 CONCACAF Champions League in which he came on as a 69th-minute substitute for Abraham Stringel and scored the equalizer for UANL in the 89th minute to help them to a 1–1 draw.

Espericueta never made a league debut with Tigres, however he did play 5 Copa MX matches with the team.

Villarreal B
On 31 January 2014 it was announced that Espericueta was loaned out to Villarreal B for 1 year.

Espercueta made his league debut 22 February 2014 against Espanyol B coming in as a substitute for Sergio Marcos González in the 60' minute of the game. Espericueta made his first goal for the team 26 April 2014 against CF Badalona. the game ended in a 1–0 win for Villarreal B.

Atlético Veracruz
He played with Atlético Veracruz of the Liga de Balompié Mexicano during the league's inaugural season, leading them to a runners-up finish after losing to Chapulineros de Oaxaca in the finals.

International career

Mexico U17
Espericueta was part of the Mexican team that participated in the 2011 FIFA U-17 World Cup. He was one of Mexico's most important players during the tournament and was awarded the Adidas Silver Ball as the tournament's second best player. Espericueta scored his first goal in the tournament against Congo in the group stage. In the semifinals, Espericueta scored the 2-2 equalizer against Germany. The goal was scored directly from a corner kick. Mexico would end up winning the tournament beating Uruguay in the final.

Mexico U20
Espericueta was selected to play the 2013 CONCACAF U-20 Championship in which he made 3 appearances and managed to score one goal in the final against United States Mexico won the match 3-1 and were crowned champions of the tournament. He was part of the Mexican team that participated in the 2013 FIFA U-20 World Cup. Espericueta managed to appear in all 4 matches, and scored a free kick against Greece. Mexico were eliminated by Spain in the knockout stage. Espericueta also appeared in the 2013 and 2014 editions of the Toulon Tournament.

Career statistics

Club

Honours
Tigres UANL
Liga MX: Apertura 2015; Apertura 2016

Mexico Youth
FIFA U-17 World Cup: 2011
Milk Cup: 2012
CONCACAF U-20 Championship: 2013
Central American and Caribbean Games: 2014
Pan American Silver Medal: 2015

Individual
FIFA U-17 World Cup Silver Ball: 2011

References

External links 
 
 Villareal Profile
 FIFA Profile

1994 births
Living people
Sportspeople from Monterrey
Footballers from Nuevo León
Association football midfielders
Mexico youth international footballers
Mexico under-20 international footballers
Tigres UANL footballers
Villarreal CF B players
Atlético San Luis footballers
Liga MX players
Segunda División B players
Mexican expatriate footballers
Expatriate footballers in Spain
Mexican expatriate sportspeople in Spain
Mexican people of Basque descent
Footballers at the 2015 Pan American Games
Pan American Games medalists in football
Pan American Games silver medalists for Mexico
Central American and Caribbean Games gold medalists for Mexico
Central American and Caribbean Games medalists in football
Competitors at the 2014 Central American and Caribbean Games
Medalists at the 2015 Pan American Games
Liga de Balompié Mexicano players
21st-century Mexican people
Mexican footballers